Okabe or Occabe, is a  high Pyrenean summit in the Basse-Navarre province of the Basque country in France.

Name 
Okʰabe is a hydronym from a spring located on the southern slope.

Topography 
Mount Okabe lies on the pyrenean watershed. Cromlechs called harrespils lie on the western slope of the massif.

26 cromlechs or harrespils have been found on the Okabe plateau. Perhaps the area of an ancient pastoral passage, no written record provides any explanation for the presence of these prehistorical or protohistoric relics. Researchers have found pavings and remains of charcoal and ash in the middle of the rings. Corps cremation and funerary rituels suggest it was a necropole.

Access 

Possible from Estérençuby or the Irati Forest. From Saint-Jean-Pied-de-Port, take the col d'Iraty road, go past la chapelle Saint-Sauveur, go up to the summit of the col de Burdincurutcheta, go down to the plateau d'Iraty and take the D301 road to the col de Sourzay summit. Stop at the house (the only one in 2011). Mount Okabe lies south-east; then about an hour's walk.

Gallery

References 

Mountains of the Basque Country (autonomous community)
Mountains of the Pyrenees
Mountains of Pyrénées-Atlantiques
One-thousanders of France